Benoy (Bena) is a rural locality (a selo) and the administrative centre of Benoyskoye Rural Settlement in Nozhay-Yurtovsky District, in Chechnya, Russia. Population:

History
In 1944, during the Soviet era, the selo was renamed Ichichali as part of the forced deportation of the Chechen and Ingush populations, and was repopulated with people from neighboring Dagestan. 

However, in 1958, after the restoration of the Chechen-Ingush Autonomous Soviet Socialist Republic, the village was returned to its original name of Benoy and the Dagestani residents were resettled back to Dagestan.

Geography
Benoy is located in the Chechen Republic, Russia. It is situated on the right bank of the Benoyassi River and is approximately 23 km southwest of the district center, Nozhai-Yurt and 90 km southeast of the city of Grozny. The village has neighboring settlements, including Gurzhi-Mokhk to the north, Dengi-Yurt to the northeast, Ozhi-Yurt to the east, Koren-Benoi to the south, Benoi-Vedeno to the southwest, and Pachu to the west. A notable landmark in the village is the Benoi Central Mosque.

Demography

Notable residents
Baysangur of Benoy (1794 – 1861), rebel commander
Adam Delimkhanov (born 1969), politician
Sulim Yamadayev (1973 – 2009), rebel and military commander

References 

Rural localities in Nozhay-Yurtovsky District